Adolph Moeller (May 20, 1828 – November 11, 1901) was an American merchant and politician.

Born in Altona, Holstein, Germany, Moeller was in the mercantile business. He served in the volunteer army in the First Schleswig War against Denmark from 1848 to 1851. In 1851, Moeller emigrated to the United States and settled in the town of New Holstein, Calumet County, Wisconsin. He was in the hardware business. In 1855, he served as chairman of the New Holstein Town Board. In 1882, Moeller served in the Wisconsin State Assembly and was a Republican. Moeller died at his home in Milwaukee, Wisconsin.

Notes

External links

1828 births
1901 deaths
German emigrants to the United States
Politicians from Milwaukee
People from New Holstein, Wisconsin
Businesspeople from Wisconsin
Mayors of places in Wisconsin
Republican Party members of the Wisconsin State Assembly
19th-century American politicians
19th-century American businesspeople